Ahmed Farzeen (born 10 January 1992) is an Indian first-class cricketer who plays for Kerala. He is a right-handed fast medium bowler and a right-handed lower order batsman.

Career
Ahmed was born in Thalassery to T. N Savan and Amina Beevi. He made his first-class cricket debut for Kerala against Jammu and Kashmir on 1 October 2015 in 2015-16 Ranji Trophy. It was his performances in C.K Nayudu Trophy that paved way to his Ranji Trophy debut. He is included in the 14-man squad of KCA Tuskers for 2020–21 KCA President's Cup T20.

References

External links
 

1992 births
Living people
Indian cricketers
Kerala cricketers
People from Thalassery
Cricketers from Kerala